Premier is an unincorporated community in McDowell County, West Virginia, United States. Premier has a post office with ZIP code 24878.

The community most likely was named after the local Premier Coal Company.

References

Unincorporated communities in McDowell County, West Virginia
Unincorporated communities in West Virginia
Coal towns in West Virginia